This article shows the rosters of all participating teams at the Women's U23 World Championship 2017 in Ljubljana, Slovenia.

Pool A

The following is the Slovenian roster in the 2017 FIVB Women's U23 World Championship.

Head coach: Alessandro Chiappini

The following is the Dominican roster in the 2017 FIVB Women's U23 World Championship.

Head coach: Wagner Pacheco

The following is the Chinese roster in the 2017 FIVB Women's U23 World Championship.

Head coach: Wu Sheng

The following is the Thai roster in the 2017 FIVB Women's U23 World Championship.

Head coach: Chamnan Dokmai

The following is the Egyptian roster in the 2017 FIVB Women's U23 World Championship.

Head coach: Maged Mohamed

The following is the Argentine roster in the 2017 FIVB Women's U23 World Championship.

Head coach: Martín López

Pool B

The following is the Brazilian roster in the 2017 FIVB Women's U23 World Championship.

Head coach: Wagner Fernandes

The following is the Turkish roster in the 2017 FIVB Women's U23 World Championship.

Head coach: Ataman Guneyligil

The following is the Japanese roster in the 2017 FIVB Women's U23 World Championship.

Head coach: Kiyoshi Abo

The following is the Bulgarian roster in the 2017 FIVB Women's U23 World Championship.

Head coach: Antonina Zetova

The following is the Cuban roster in the 2017 FIVB Women's U23 World Championship.

Head coach: Wilfredo Robinson

The following is the Kenyan roster in the 2017 FIVB Women's U23 World Championship.

Head coach: Catherine Mabwi

See also
 2017 FIVB Volleyball Men's U23 World Championship squads

References

External links 
 Official website

FIVB Volleyball Women's U23 World Championship
FIVB Volleyball Women's U23 World Championship
FIVB Volleyball World Championship squads